Hugh Christie School  is a secondary school and sixth form based in Tonbridge, Kent, England. In November 2006 the school moved into a new £14 million building. The school currently has a roll of approximately 1150 students.

Hugh Christie is part of the Tonbridge School Federation, which includes Long Mead Primary School and Little Foxes Children's Centre. The Principal of the Federation is Jon Barker while the Head of School is Mark Fenn.

School history 
The school first opened in 1957, founded by Hugh Christie, with Roy Howard as the head teacher under the name "Hugh Christie Secondary Modern." It was originally a one-building school in Norwich Avenue. Between the 1960s and 2006, it was located at two neighbouring sites, Norwich Avenue and White Cottage Road. The school's motto, taken from Acts 27:23 of the King James Bible, was "Whose I am I Serve". Deputy headteacher Daphne Whitmore received the MBE in the Queen's Birthday Honours list of 1988.

In 1994 the school was re-branded as "Hugh Christie Technology College" and became well known for its specialities in Information and Communication Technology. A new logo and new uniform were subsequently introduced. The motto changed to "Learning to succeed".

In March 2006, the school began an extensive rebuilding project, which was completed in September 2007, allowing the school to be located on a single site, White Cottage Road. An updated logo and uniform were also introduced.

An all-weather playing field has recently been completed.

Hugh Christie is also home to the Tonbridge Tennis Club.

The school's motto is "The Place to Be" and was re-branded to Hugh Christie School in 2018, following the loss of the technology college status.

Notable former pupils 
 Dame Kelly Holmes, Olympic athlete
 Rob Smith (racing driver)
 Andy Titterrell, rugby player
 Paul Way, golfer
Isaac Holman, singer

References

External links
Official site

Educational institutions established in 1957
Secondary schools in Kent
1957 establishments in England
Foundation schools in Kent
Schools in Tonbridge